Mile Run may refer to:

Mile Run (New Jersey)
Mile Run (White Deer Creek)
Mile run